Yuka Watanabe (born 26 August 1967) is a Japanese equestrian. She competed in two events at the 2004 Summer Olympics.

References

1967 births
Living people
Japanese female equestrians
Olympic equestrians of Japan
Equestrians at the 2004 Summer Olympics
Place of birth missing (living people)